Vincent Dargein (10 January 1863 – 29 November 1917) was a French fencer. He competed in the men's masters sabre event at the 1900 Summer Olympics.

References

External links
 

1863 births
1917 deaths
French male sabre fencers
Olympic fencers of France
Fencers at the 1900 Summer Olympics
Sportspeople from Ariège (department)